Familien Pille som Spejdere is a 1915 Danish silent film directed by Lau Lauritzen Sr. The film stars Oscar Stribolt, Henny Lauritzen and Carl Schenstrøm.

Cast
Oscar Stribolt - Pille, apoteker i Lilleby
Henny Lauritzen - Fru Pille, apotekerfrue
Carl Schenstrøm - Gert Pille, apotekersøn

External links

Danish Film Institute

1915 films
Danish silent films
Films directed by Lau Lauritzen Sr.
Danish black-and-white films